Caterina or Catharina van Hemessen (1528 – after 1565) was a Flemish Renaissance painter.  She is the earliest female Flemish painter for whom there is verifiable extant work.  She is mainly known for a series of small-scale female portraits completed between the late 1540s and early 1550s and a few religious compositions.

Van Hemessen is often given the distinction of creating the first self-portrait of an artist (of either gender) depicted seated at an easel. This portrait, created in 1548, shows the artist in the early stages of painting a portrait and is now part of the collection of the Kunstmuseum Basel. Other paintings by van Hemessen are in the Rijksmuseum in Amsterdam and in the National Gallery, London.

A number of obstacles stood in the way of women of her time who wished to become painters. Their training would involve both the dissection of cadavers and the study of the nude male figure while the system of apprenticeship meant that the aspiring artist would need to live with an older artist for 4–5 years, often beginning from the age of 9–15. For these reasons, female artists were extremely rare, and those that did make it through were typically trained by a close relative, in van Hemessen's case, by her father, Jan Sanders van Hemessen.

Life
She was the daughter of Jan Sanders van Hemessen (c. 1500-after 1563), a prominent Mannerist painter in Antwerp who had studied in Italy. Her father is believed to have been her teacher and she likely collaborated with him on many of his paintings She became a master in the Guild of Saint Luke in Antwerp and was the teacher of three students.

Van Hemessen was a successful painter in her lifetime. She gained an important patron in the 1540s in the person of Maria of Austria, who served as regent of the Low Countries on behalf of her brother Charles V. In 1554, van Hemessen married Christian de Morien, an organist at the Antwerp Cathedral, which was an important position at that time. In 1556, when Maria of Austria returned to Spain, Catharina and her husband moved there, at the invitation of her patron. Two years later, when Maria died, Catharina was given a sizeable pension for life. Catharina and her husband returned to Antwerp where they are recorded in 1561.  At that time the couple was childless.  Her husband received an appointment to work in 's-Hertogenbosch and the couple moved there around 1565.

In her lifetime she was mentioned by two Italian artist biographers, Lodovico Guicciardini in his Description of the Low Countries of 1567 and Giorgio Vasari in his Vite of 1568.

At the age of 60, Catharina died of natural causes in Antwerp.

Work
While van Hemessen did create at least two religious paintings, she was mainly a portraitist.  Eight small portraits and two religious pictures, with dates between 1548 and 1552, bearing her signature have survived. She portrayed ostensibly wealthy men and women often posed against a dark background.  The delicate figures she painted have a graceful charm and are provided with stylish costumes and accessories. Her best-known work is her self-portrait (Kunstmuseum Basel), inscribed in Latin: "I Caterina van Hemessen have painted myself / 1548 / Her age 20". Also in 1548, she painted Woman At Virginals which may have been a portrait of her sister Christina. It is thought that her self portrait  and the Woman At Virginals were a pair to be hung together. Catharina mainly created portraits characterized by realism. The sitters, often seated, were usually seen against a dark or neutral ground. This type of framing and setting made for an intimate portrait. 

Van Hemessen's portraits are characterized by their realism. The one self-portrait and the half a dozen other portraits that have been attributed to her are small, quiet pictures. The sitters, often seated, were usually portrayed against a dark or neutral ground, their gazes rarely meeting the viewer's eyes. This type of framing and setting made for an intimate and dignified portrait. 

She produced religious compositions which were generally less successful than her portraits.

There are no extant works later than 1554, which has led some historians to believe her artistic career might have ended after her marriage, which was common in the case of female artists. Although she retired, Catharina still taught three male apprentices.

Selected works

Portrait of a Lady, 1551, National Gallery, London
Portrait of a Lady in 16th Century Dress, Bowes Museum
Young Woman Playing the Virginals, 1548, Cologne, Wallraf-Richartz Museum

Gallery

Notes

Sources
 Chadwick, Whitney, Women, Art, and Society, Thames and Hudson, London, 1990
 Jones, Susan Frances. Van Eyck to Gossaert. London: National Gallery, 2011. 
 Harris, Anne Sutherland and Linda Nochlin, Women Artists: 1550-1950, Los Angeles County Museum of Art, Knopf, New York, 1976
 Kemperdick, Stephan. The Early Portrait, from the Collection of the Prince of Liechtenstein and the Kunstmuseum Basel. Munich: Prestel, 2006. 
 Kleiner, Fred. Gardner's Art Through the Ages. Wadsworth, 2009. 
 Heller, Nancy. Women Artists: An Illustrated History. New York: Abbeville Press, 1997.

External links
 

https://www.tripimprover.com/blog/self-portrait-1548-by-caterina-van-hemessen
https://www.bbc.com/culture/article/20210305-caterina-van-hemessen-an-unknown-visual-pioneer
https://www.nationalgallery.org.uk/artists/catharina-van-hemessen

 
Flemish Renaissance painters
Flemish portrait painters
Flemish history painters
Flemish women painters
Painters from Antwerp
1528 births
16th-century deaths